Football Club Atyrau ("Atyraý" fýtbol klýby) is a professional football club based in Atyrau, who last played in the Kazakhstan Premier League, the highest level of Kazakh football. The club's home ground is the 8,690-seat Munaishy Stadium, where they have played since their inception.

History 
Founded as Prikaspiets in 1980, they played only two seasons in the Soviet Second League. In 2000, the club was refounded as Akzhaiyk to play in the Kazakhstan First Division. Next season, they were promoted to the Kazakhstan Premier League with a new name Atyrau. The club colours, reflected in their badge and kit, are green and white. The club's crest is a green and white striped shield, with an oil drop in a ball form in the centre, incorporates the cities role in oil industry.

On 14 December 2016, Atyrau appointed Zoran Vulić as manager.

On 8 January 2018, Vakhid Masudov was appointed as FC Atyrau's new manager. On 9 April 2018, Masudov left Atyrau by mutual consent, with Adrian Sosnovschi being appointed as Atyrau's new manager on 11 April 2018. Adrian Sosnovschi and his coaching team resigned on 1 July 2018, with Viktor Kumykov being appointed as Atyrau's third manager of the season on 4 July 2018.

Domestic history

Continental history

Honours 
Kazakhstan Cup (1) 2009

Current squad

Managers 

 Alibek Amirov (1980–81)
 Kairat Aimanov (2000)
 Vait Talgayev (2000–02)
 Oleksandr Holokolosov (2002–05)
 Sergey Timofeev (2005)
 Aleksandr Averyanov (2006)
 Murat Munbayev (2006)
 Vyacheslav Yeremeyev (2007)
 Bakhtiyar Baiseitov (2007)
 Sergei Volgin (2008)
 Sergey Andreyev (2008)
 Anton Shokh (2009)
 Vakhid Masudov (2009–10)
 Viktor Pasulko (2010)
 Kairat Aimanov (2010)
 Ramiz Mammadov (2010–11)
 Zoran Filipović (2011–12)
 Yuri Konkov (2012)
 Miodrag Radulović (2012–13)
 Anatoliy Yurevich (2013–14)
 Vladimir Nikitenko (2014–16)
 Stoycho Mladenov (2016)
 Zoran Vulić (2016–17)
 Sergei Pavlov (2017)
 Vakhid Masudov (2018)
 Adrian Sosnovschi (2018)
 Viktor Kumykov (2018–19)
 Kuanysh Kabdulov  (2019)
 Oleg Dulub (2019)
 Kuanysh Kabdulov  (2019–20)
 Aram Voskanyan (2020–2021)
 Konstantin Gorovenko (2021–2022)
 Vitaly Zhukovsky (2022)

References

External links 

  
 FC Atyrau on UEFA.com

 
2000 establishments in Kazakhstan
Atyrau, FC
Atyrau, FC
Atyrau